is a public junior college in Takizawa, Iwate, Japan. It was established in 1951 in Morioka, Iwate, and has been attached to Iwate Prefectural University since 1998.

Departments
 Department of Home Economics
 Department of International culture

See also
 List of junior colleges in Japan
 Miyako Junior College

External links
 

Public universities in Japan
Japanese junior colleges
Universities and colleges in Iwate Prefecture
Takizawa, Iwate